"The First Note Is Silent" is a song by Welsh disc jockey and producer High Contrast in collaboration with Dutch disc jockey and producer Tiësto and Welsh electronic music band Underworld. It was released as digital download and 12" vinyl on 28 October 2011 by Hospital Records in the United Kingdom as the first single from High Contrast's fifth studio album  The Agony and the Ecstasy.

Music video 
The music video was premiered on High Contrast's official YouTube channel on 7 October 2011. It was directed by High Contrast himself.

Track listing 
 Digital Download (NHS195DD)
 "The First Note Is Silent" (Radio Edit) - 3:37
 "The First Note Is Silent" - 5:57
 "The First Note Is Silent" (Instrumental) - 5:38
 "Fearful Symmetry" - 6:00

 12" (NHS195)
 "The First Note Is Silent" - 5:57
 "Fearful Symmetry" - 6:00

 Digital download - Tiësto Remix
 "The First Note Is Silent" (Tiësto Remix) - 8:10

Charts

References 

2011 songs
2011 singles
Tiësto songs
Songs written by Tiësto
Underworld (band) songs
Drum and bass songs
Songs written by Karl Hyde
Songs written by Rick Smith (musician)